Marie-France Curtil is a retired French slalom canoeist who competed in the late 1960s. She won a silver medal in the mixed C-2 team event at the 1969 ICF Canoe Slalom World Championships in Bourg St.-Maurice.

References

External links 
 Marie-France CURTIL at CanoeSlalom.net

French female canoeists
Living people
Year of birth missing (living people)
Medalists at the ICF Canoe Slalom World Championships